The motor gun boat (MGB) was a small, high-speed British military vessel of the Second World War, which was armed with a mix of guns, in contrast to the physically similar motor torpedo boat (MTB), whose main offensive weapon were torpedoes. The small size of the MGBs, and their high speed, made them difficult targets for German E-boats, though, like their opponents, they were limited by heavy weather, because they did not provide a stable-enough platform to aim the guns. The large number of guns meant the crew was relatively large, numbering as high as thirty men on the largest boats.

Description 
MGBs were extremely heavily armed for vessels of their size. Early MGBs were, nevertheless, small boats, being based on Motor Anti-Submarine Boats of 63-70 feet in length; these would later be considered 'short' boats by Coastal Forces. These were mostly equipped with one heavy weapon and numerous lighter guns. The later 71.5-feet short MGBs would sport two heavy weapon locations (a pom-pom forward and twin Oerlikon aft), outmatching contemporary enemy boats of larger size. The outstanding feature of most short MGBs was their very high speed of 36-40 knots, enabling them to work with, or in place of, MTBs on offensive sweeps.

From June 1941, the Fairmile Type 'C' MGB began to join Coastal Forces; this boat was based on the earlier Type 'A' Motor launch and was the first of the 'long boats', being 110 feet long. A major feature of the long MGBs was that they carried two heavy guns as well as numerous lighter weapons; the 27-knot Type 'C' began to introduce the versatile & hard-hitting Vickers pom-pom to Coastal Forces' inventory, as well as carrying one of the ubiquitous 2-pdr Rolls guns on the aft bandstand.

In March 1942, the first of the Fairmile 'D's joined the MGB force, this type becoming the main long MGB for the remainder of the conflict. These had room for an even heavier armament than the Type 'C' and the weight of armament was incrementally improved as the war went on. early models had as little as one powered pom-pom mount forward, twin powered 20mm aft and two twin HMGs by the bridge plus LMGs, but more often placed the 20mm twin mount amidships and added a QF 6-pdr gun aft.  By 1945, MGB 658 carried two power-mounted QF 6-pounders in the A and Y turret positions, a twin 20 mm Oerlikon cannon in the X turret position, a single 20 mm Oerlikon on either side forward of the bridge, and two twin .303 Vickers machine guns on the bridge wings. They were also equipped with smoke-making equipment, basic radar and depth charges.

Service 

In the early years of the war, MGBs saw action defending shipping against enemy torpedo boats, such as the German E-boats, on the southern and eastern coasts of the UK, with the faster 'short' boats frequently undertaking patrols hunting for the enemy. MGB flotillas (particularly under Robert Hichens' command) also developed the tactic of accompanying MTBs on their patrols across the North Sea to attack enemy coastal shipping. On these missions, the MGBs' role was to close stealthily with the enemy and then attack with guns from an unexpected quarter, drawing the convoy escort's attention, while the MTBs manoeuvred into position unseen by the Germans, so as to better attack the protected convoy shipping with their torpedoes. 

The modest speed of the larger & heavier Type 'C' compared with the short boats saw them assigned much more frequently to defensive & convoy escort duties as well as clandestine work. The latter duties often involved extraction of Allied agents/escapees from occupied France but also included the commando raid 'Operation Chariot': Robert Ryder used a Type 'C' MGB for command of the St Nazaire Raid. Ryder and William Savage, the gunner of the unprotected two-pounder gun on MGB 314, received Victoria Crosses for their part in the raid, Savage posthumously.

In the Mediterranean, MGBs were used in an attacking role to sink Italian and German shipping. They were formed into flotillas which often operated alongside motor torpedo boats (or US PT boats) and helped interdict supplies being sent from Italy to Axis forces in North Africa in 1943. After that campaign, they moved northwards and assisted with the invasion of Sicily, Sardinia, Corsica and Elba. 
Operating from island bases they patrolled along the western coast of Italy, attacking small coastal ships and E-boats until mid-1944. As Italy was progressively liberated, certain flotillas, such as the 56th, were sent around Italy to the Adriatic to assist partisans in the islands off Yugoslavia.

MGBs were also involved in the protection of shipping after D-Day.

MGBs did not take the prefix HMS as they were boats, not ships, and instead used the prefix "HMMGB" on formal occasions. The crews generally referred to them by their numbers.

In 1947, MGB 2009 was fitted with a Metrovick gas turbine, thereby becoming the world's first gas turbine powered naval vessel.

Types

British Power Boats
Early-war Motor Anti-Submarine Boats (MA/SBs) built by BPB Co. were converted from early 1941 into MGBs. These included 63-feet and 70-feet types.

63-feet MGBs (numbered 40-45) were of 24t std displacement and powered by 2-shaft Rolls-Royce petrol engines developing 2,200bhp for a top speed of 40 knots. They were rearmed for the MGB role with 1 x 20mm Oerlikon aft (some may have briefly carried a Rolls gun until the Oerlikon was available), a twin HMG turret on the coach-house roof and 2-4 x .303-inch MGs (two twin mounts would be mounted abreast the wheelhouse).

70-feet MGBs were of several different original batches or types: MGB 6-21 originally had 3-shaft Napier petrol engines for 1,650bhp and a top speed of 27 knots, being later refitted with Packards for 3,600bhp and 38 kts, while MGB 46 and MGB 50-67 had 3-shaft Rolls-Royce installations for 3,300bhp and a top speed of 36.7 kts. All were of 28-30t std displacement. Individual armament varied, but most boats had 2 x twin HMG turrets abreast the bridge (some early models had the single dorsal turret seen on the 63-feet type) in the case of ex-French boats like MGB 66 these turrets relaced a pair of twin 0.303-inch turret which had been carried side-by-side amidships. Heavier gun armament on these boats, located aft, was initially either a 2-pdr 'Rolls gun' or less commonly a Boulton & Paul quad 0.303-inch MG turret. Surviving boats were later rearmed with a far more effective Oerlikon in the aft position.

71½ ft Motor Gun Boat
BPB built 34  purpose-built 72-ft MGBs (also referred to as 71.5-feet). Capable of 40 knots, they carried a hydraulically-powered 2-pounder gun mount forwards for engaging other vessels, along with a twin powered 20mm mount on the aft cabin roof and two twin .303-in machine guns (one either side of the wheelhouse) for additional firepower in surface actions as well as defence from aircraft. Some early boats even carried a Holman Projector right aft. Side-dropping depth charges and smoke generators at the stern completed the loadout.

Over one hundred vessels of this class built, first ones were given identities MGB 74-97 The second series were numbered MGB 107-onwards. After the initial 34 MGBs, further craft of the 71.5-feet type (in the sequence up to 176 and from 502 onwards) were of a modified type, known as a 'Type G' to the Canadians, and were intended to be MTBs. However, some of the earlier boats in the 'Type G' series were only ever equipped 'for but not with' 18-inch torpedo tubes and otherwise were armed as the original 2-pdr MGB variant, functioning as gunboats in the mixed 29th Motor Torpedo Boat Flotilla alongside the torpedo-armed MTB versions from 1944.

Camper and Nicholson
All Camper & Nicholson MGBs were composite-hulled craft.

The entirely gun-armed MGB 502 class was preceded by the experimental MGB 501, which was a unique vessel adapted from a combined MA/SB & MTB design and completed in 1942 as a combined MGB & MTB, with 1 x 2-pdr pom pom, 1 x Oerlikon cannon, 2 x twin 0.5-inch HMGs and 2 x 21-inch torpedo tubes.

The 502 class were slightly enlarged but otherwise based on the design of 501. They dispensed with the torpedo tubes and shipped an armament of 1 x pom pom in MkXVI mounting, 1 x twin Oerlikon in MkV mounting, 2 x twin HMGs and a 6-pdr Hotchkiss gun.
Only 502, 503 and 509 were completed as MGBs; 504-508 were completed as fast blockade runners Master Standfast, Gay Corsair, Gay Viking, Hopewell and Nonsuch.

Dimensions for the Camper and Nicholson motor gunboats (MGB 502 to MGB 509):
 Length: 
 Beam: 
 Draught: 
 Displacement: 95 tons
 Propulsion: 3 × Paxman VRB diesel engines
 Total power output: 3,000 bhp
 Speed:
 Maximum: 
 Continuous: 
 Complement: 21
 Endurance:  at 

Later re-numbered MGB 2009, the central engine was replaced  with a Metrovick F.2 gas turbine engine in 1947.

Elco
Elco built twelve  MGBs for the Royal Navy.

Higgins
Higgins built 12  MGBs and 15  MGBs.

Fairmile designs
Fairmile Marine produced designs for small craft for the Royal Navy but most construction was carried out in other yards.

For flexibility the following Fairmile D design (approx. 200 built) could be fitted out either as MGB or MTB. These equipped the Royal Canadian Navy, Royal Navy, and Royal Norwegian Navy.

Survivors 
The only fully restored and operational example of a Royal Navy Coastal Forces MGB which saw active service in World War II is MGB-81. She was built by the British Power Boat Company, Hythe, launched in 1942, and served at the Normandy landings. She is now at Portsmouth.

See also
Motor launch
Harbour defence motor launch
Fairmile C motor gunboat
Steam gun boat
Motor torpedo boat
Coastal Forces of the Royal Navy
Type Two 63 ft HSL
Robert Peverell Hichens, renowned MGB flotilla commander
Guy Hamilton, film director who served on MGBs during the war.

References

Bibliography 
Motor Gunboat 658 LC Reynolds (Cassell Military Paperbacks, London, 2002)

External links
 British Military Powerboat Trust
 Whaleback MGB
The Coastal Forces Heritage Trust
Official account of MGB and MTB actions in Mediterranean 1943, published 1948 
 Database MTB-/MGB-Battles 1940-1945. Historisches Marinearchiv (German/English)

Gunboat classes
Boat types
Ships of the Royal Navy